MacLeod, McLeod and Macleod are surnames in the English language. The names are anglicised forms of the Scottish Gaelic , meaning "son of Leòd", derived from the Old Norse Liótr ("ugly").

One of the earliest occurrences of the surname is of Gillandres MacLeod, in 1227. There are two recognised Scottish clans with the surname: Clan MacLeod of Harris and Skye, and Clan MacLeod of Lewis and Raasay. The earliest record of these two families, using a form of the surname MacLeod, occurs in the mid 14th century.

There are also documented cases of Scottish missionaries in Canada using McLeod as an Anglicisation of the indigenous Cree language name  (meaning "the big one"), which accounts for its occurrence amongst Canadian people of Cree heritage.

People with the surname MacLeod, McLeod, Macleod 
A. A. MacLeod (20th century), Canadian politician from Ontario
Anna MacGillivray Macleod, Scottish Professor of Brewing and Biochemistry
Aileen McLeod, Scottish National Party MSP
Alan Arnett McLeod (1899–1918), Canadian recipient of the Victoria Cross
Alexander McLeod (1796–1871), Scottish-Canadian sheriff acquitted of murder charges in connection to the Caroline Affair
Alexander Samuel MacLeod (1888–1956), Canadian artist
Alistair MacLeod (1936–2014), Canadian author
Ally MacLeod (1931–2004), Scottish football player, manager, and manager of Scotland team
Ally McLeod (born 1951), Scottish football player
Andrew MacLeod (born 1966) Humanitarian Expert and CEO
Andrew McLeod (born 1976) Australian Rules footballer
Angus MacLeod (disambiguation)
Angus McLeod (disambiguation)
Bryan McLeod (born 1974), Canadian politician from Manitoba
Charlotte MacLeod (1922–2005), Canadian mystery fiction writer
Clarence J. McLeod (1895–1959)
Cody McLeod (born 1984), Canadian professional ice hockey player
Colin MacLeod (1909–1972), Canadian-American geneticist
Cynthia H. McLeod (born 1936), Surinamese novelist
Dave MacLeod (born 1978), Scottish rock climber
David McLeod (born 1971), American football player
Debbie McLeod (born 1972), Scottish field hockey goalkeeper
Della Campbell MacLeod (ca. 1884 – ?), American author and journalist
Donald Bannerman Macleod (1887–1972), New Zealand physicist
Donald Friell McLeod (1810–1872), British Lieutenant-Governor of Punjab
Donald Kenneth McLeod (1885–1958), British Army officer with the British Indian Army
Donald Macleod (born 1940), Scottish theologian
Duncan Lloyd McLeod (1874–1935), Canadian politician from Manitoba
Duncan Stuart McLeod (1854–1933), Canadian politician from Manitoba
Eddie McLeod (1900–1989), New Zealand cricketer
Eddie McLeod (footballer) (fl 1930s), Scottish footballer
Erin McLeod (born 1983), Canadian soccer player
Fred McLeod (golfer) (1882–1976), Scottish-American golfer
G. Scott MacLeod (born 1965), Canadian multimedia artist and film director 
Gavin MacLeod (1930–2021), American actor
George MacLeod (1895–1991), Scottish churchman, founder of the Iona Community
Henry Dunning Macleod (1821–1902), Scottish economist
Herbert McLeod (1841–1923), British chemist
Hugh McLeod (footballer) (1907–1929), Scottish footballer
Hugh McLeod (politician) (1843–1879), Canadian lawyer
Hugh McLeod (rugby union) (1932–2014), Scottish rugby player
Iain MacLeod (disambiguation), several people
Iain Borb MacLeod (1392–1442), Scottish clan chief
Iain Ciar MacLeod (1330–), Scottish clan chief
Iain Norman Macleod (1913–1970), British politician
Ian R. MacLeod (born 1956), British science fiction and fantasy author
Izale McLeod (born 1984), British footballer
James Macleod (1836–1894), Scottish-Canadian pioneer and RCMP commissioner
Jeanette McLeod New Zealand mathematician
Jenny McLeod (born 1941) New Zealand composer 
Joan MacLeod (born 1954), Canadian playwright
John MacLeod (basketball) (1937–2019), American basketball coach
John McLeod (footballer, born 1888)
John George Macleod (1915–2006), Scottish Physician and writer of medical books
John James Rickard Macleod (1876–1935), Scottish biochemist and co-discoverer of insulin
Joseph Macleod (1903–1984), British poet, actor, playwright, theatre director and BBC newsreader
Kam McLeod (died 2019), Canadian fugitive
Karen MacLeod (1958–2021), British long-distance runner
Keith McLeod (born 1979), American basketball player
Ken MacLeod (born 1954), Scottish science fiction writer 
Ken McLeod (born 1948), American Buddhist teacher, writer, translator
Kevin MacLeod (born 1972), American composer
Kevin S. MacLeod CVO, CD (born 1951), Canadian Secretary to the Queen of Canada
Kiel McLeod (born 1982), Canadian ice hockey player
 Kirstie Macleod, British artist
Lyn McLeod (born 1942), Canadian politician from Ontario
Malcolm MacLeod (disambiguation), several people
Malcolm MacLeod (clan chief) (1296–1370), Scottish clan chief
Malcolm MacLeod (scientist) (1882–1969), British scientist
Malcolm MacLeod (politician), politician from New Brunswick, Canada
Malcolm Macleod, former Rector of the University of Edinburgh
Margaret McLeod (died 1993)
Marilyn McLeod (born 1939), American songwriter and singer
Martin McLeod (1813–1860), American pioneer, trader, and territorial legislator
Mary MacLeod Trump, (1912–2000), Scottish-American philanthropist, mother of Donald Trump.
Mary MacLeod (actress) (1937–2016), Scottish actress of the theatre, film and television
Mary McLeod Bethune (1875–1955), American educator
Mata Hari, stage name for Margaretha Geertruida MacLeod (1876-1917), executed by France as a German spy in 1917
Moira MacLeod (born 1957), British field hockey player
Michael McLeod (disambiguation), several people
Michael McLeod (ice hockey) (born 1998), Canadian ice hockey player
Michael McLeod (politician) (born 1959), Canadian politician
Mike McLeod (athlete) (born 1952), British runner
Mike McLeod (gridiron football) (born 1958), American football player
Mike McLeod (actor) (born 1985), Canadian film and television actor
Michael McLeod (journalist), American journalist who has written about Bigfoot
Michael McLeod (musician), Australian bassist and clean vocalist
Nathanel William Hamish Macleod (born 1940), British Financial Secretary of Hong Kong 1991–1995
Neil McLeod (field hockey) (born 1952), New Zealand field hockey player
Neil McLeod (politician) (1842–1915), Canadian politician from Prince Edward Island
Nicholas McLeod (fl. 1868–1889) Scottish businessman and missionary
Norman MacLeod (disambiguation), several people
Norm MacLeod (born 1904), an Australian rules footballer 
Norman MacLeod (1812–1872), a Scottish churchman and writer [son of Norman Macleod (Caraid nan Gaidheal) below]
Norman MacLeod (Canadian businessman), a president of the Liberal Party of Canada
Norman Macleod (Caraid nan Gaidheal) (1783–1862), a Scottish churchman and writer
Norman Macleod (journalist) (born about 1967), a Scottish television presenter
Norman MacLeod of MacLeod (1812–1895), the 25th chief of Clan MacLeod
Norman Z. McLeod (1898–1964),  film director
Omar McLeod (born 1994), Jamaican hurdler
Peden McLeod (1940-2021), American lawyer and politician
Sir Reginald MacLeod of MacLeod, the 27th chief of Clan MacLeod
Roderick Macleod (disambiguation), several people
Roderick Macleod (Alberta politician) (1959–1963), Canadian politician
Sir Roderick Macleod of Macleod, the 15th chief of Clan MacLeod
Rodney McLeod (born 1990), American football player
Rory McLeod (singer-songwriter) (born 1957), British folk singer-songwriter
Rory McLeod (snooker player) (born 1971), English professional snooker player
Roshown McLeod (born 1975), former American basketball player
Ryan McLeod (born 1999), Canadian ice hockey player
Sarah McLeod (born 1971), New Zealand actress
Sarah McLeod (musician) (singer) Australian singer, former frontwoman of The Superjesus
Scott MacLeod (disambiguation), several people
Scott MacLeod (1914–1961), U.S. Department of State official 
Scott MacLeod (ice hockey) (born 1959), Canadian ice hockey player 
Scott MacLeod (rugby union) (born 1979), Scottish rugby union footballer
G. Scott MacLeod (born 1965), Canadian multimedia artist and film director 
Shane McLeod (born 1975), Australian news correspondent
Sheila MacLeod (born 1939), Scottish author and feminist
Stuart Macleod (magician) (born 1982), Scottish magician
Stuart MacLeod (musician), Australian guitarist in Eskimo Joe
Sian MacLeod (born 1962), British ambassador
William MacLeod (disambiguation), several people
William Cleireach MacLeod (1365–c.1402), Scottish clan chief
William Dubh MacLeod (c.1415–1480), Scottish clan chief

People with the given name Macleod, McLeod, MacLeod
McLeod Bethel-Thompson (born 1988), American football player
Norman Macleod Ferrers (1829–1903), a British mathematician and university administrator.
Norman MacLeod Lang (1875–1956), a Bishop of Leicester.

Fictional characters with the surnames MacLeod or McLeod
Atholl MacLeod, from the historical fiction series The Fairies Saga
Claire McLeod, from Australian Television Show McLeod's Daughters
Colin MacLeod, from Highlander: Vengeance the animated film
Connor MacLeod, from the Highlander films and television series
Duncan MacLeod, from the Highlander films and television series
Fergus MacLeod, the real name of Crowley, from the television show Supernatural
Jodi Fountain McLeod, from Australian Television Show McLeod's Daughters
Justin McLeod, from the film The Man Without a Face
Owen MacLeod, from Highlander the game
Quentin MacLeod, from Highlander the animated series
Rowena MacLeod, Crowley's mother, from the television show Supernatural
Sarah MacLeod, from Highlander: The Animated Series
Tess Silverman McLeod Ryan, from Australian television show McLeod's Daughters

Similar names
McCloud (surname)

References

Anglicized Cree-language surnames
English-language surnames
Anglicised Irish-language surnames
Anglicised Scottish Gaelic-language surnames
Clan Macleod
Patronymic surnames
Scottish surnames